Rock fleabane is a common name for several plants and may refer to:

Erigeron saxatilis
Erigeron scopulinus, native to the southwestern United States